Susanna L. Blumenthal is the William Prosser Professor of Law and Professor of History at the University of Minnesota. She won the Merle Curti Award for her book Law and the Modern Mind.

Life 
She graduated from Radcliffe College, and from Yale University, where she earned a Ph.D. and JD.

Blumenthal's book Law and the Modern Mind won the Merle Curti Award and the International Society for the History of Behavioral and Social Sciences' Cheiron Book Prize.

Works 

 Law and the Modern Mind: Consciousness and Responsibility in American Legal Culture Cambridge : Harvard University Press, 2016. , 
 How Not to Train Your Dragon, or Living Dangerously in the Law Stanford Law Review, May 2018
 "The Deviance of the Will: Policing the Bounds of Testamentary Freedom in Nineteenth-Century America", Harvard Law Review, v119 n4 (20060201): 959-1034
 "A Mania for Accumulation : The Plea of Moral Insanity in Gilded Age Will Contests" Making Legal History : Essays in Honor of William E. Nelson; NYU Press,

References 

Living people
University of Minnesota faculty
Yale Law School alumni
Radcliffe College alumni
Year of birth missing (living people)
American legal writers
American women non-fiction writers
American women legal scholars
American legal scholars
21st-century American women writers
21st-century American non-fiction writers
Merle Curti Award winners
American women academics
Yale Graduate School of Arts and Sciences alumni